Jerome Allen Seinfeld (born April 29, 1954) is an American stand-up comedian, actor, writer, and producer. He is best known for playing a semi-fictionalized version of himself in the sitcom Seinfeld (1989–1998), which he created and wrote with Larry David. The show aired on NBC from 1989 until 1998, becoming one of the most acclaimed and popular sitcoms of all time. As a stand-up comedian, Seinfeld specializes in observational comedy. In 2004, Comedy Central named him the 12th-greatest stand-up comedian of all time.

Seinfeld produced, co-wrote, and starred in the 2007 film Bee Movie, which was nominated for a Golden Globe Award for Best Animated Feature Film. In 2010, he premiered a reality series called The Marriage Ref, which aired for two seasons on NBC. Seinfeld is the creator and host of the web series Comedians in Cars Getting Coffee (2012–2019). He is married to author and philanthropist Jessica Seinfeld, with whom he has three children. Seinfeld has received twenty Primetime Emmy Award nominations for his work on Seinfeld and Comedians in Cars Getting Coffee as well as four Grammy Award nominations for his comedy albums.

Early life
Seinfeld was born in Brooklyn, New York. His father, sign painter Kálmán Seinfeld, was Jewish and collected jokes that he heard while serving in World War II. His mother, Betty (née Hosni) and her parents, Selim and Salha Hosni, were Jews from Aleppo, Syria. Their nationality was stated as Turkish when they immigrated in 1917, as Syria was under the Ottoman Empire. Seinfeld has an older sister, Carolyn. Salha's mother Garez Dayan, Seinfeld's great-grandmother, was a member of the Dayan rabbinic family, who allege ancestry back to the Medieval Exilarchs, and from the Exilarchs back to the Biblical King David. Seinfeld's second cousin is musician and actor Evan Seinfeld. Seinfeld grew up in Massapequa, New York, and attended Massapequa High School on Long Island. At the age of 16, he spent time volunteering in Kibbutz Sa'ar in Israel. He attended the State University of New York at Oswego, and transferred after his second year to Queens College, City University of New York, where he graduated in 1976 with a degree in communications and theater.

Career

Early career
Seinfeld developed an interest in stand-up comedy after brief stints in college productions. He appeared on open-mic nights at Budd Friedman's Improv Club while attending Queens College. After graduation in 1976, he tried out at an open-mic night at New York City's Catch a Rising Star, which led to an appearance in a Rodney Dangerfield HBO special. In 1980, he had a small recurring role on the sitcom Benson, playing Frankie, a mail-delivery boy who had comedy routines that no one wanted to hear. Seinfeld was abruptly fired from the show due to creative differences. Seinfeld has said that he was not told he had been fired until he turned up for the read-through session for an episode and found that there was no script for him. In January 1981, he performed stand-up on An Evening at the Improv. In May 1981, Seinfeld made an appearance on The Tonight Show Starring Johnny Carson, impressing Carson and the audience, leading to frequent appearances on that show and others, including Late Night with David Letterman. On September 5, 1987, his first one-hour special Stand-Up Confidential aired live on HBO.

Seinfeld

Seinfeld created The Seinfeld Chronicles with Larry David in 1988 for NBC. The show was later renamed Seinfeld to avoid confusion with the short-lived teen sitcom The Marshall Chronicles. By its third season, it had become the most watched sitcom on American television. The final episode aired in 1998, and the show has been a popular syndicated re-run ever since. Along with Seinfeld, the show starred Saturday Night Live alumna Julia Louis-Dreyfus and established actors Michael Richards and Jason Alexander. Alexander played George, a caricature of Larry David. Seinfeld is the only actor to appear in every episode of the show.

Seinfeld has said that his show was influenced by the 1950s sitcom The Abbott and Costello Show. In the Seinfeld season 6 DVD set, commenting on the episode "The Gymnast", Seinfeld cited Jean Shepherd as an influence, saying, "He really formed my entire comedic sensibility—I learned how to do comedy from Jean Shepherd." From 2004 to 2007, the former Seinfeld cast and crew recorded audio commentaries for episodes of the DVD releases of the show.

Post-Seinfeld
After he ended his sitcom, Seinfeld moved back to New York City and returned to stand-up comedy instead of staying in Los Angeles and furthering his acting career. In 1998, he went on tour and recorded a comedy special, titled I'm Telling You for the Last Time. The process of developing and performing new material at clubs around the world was chronicled in a 2002 documentary, Comedian, which also featured fellow comic Orny Adams and was directed by Christian Charles. Seinfeld has written several books, mostly archives of past routines. In the late 1990s, Apple Computer came up with the advertising slogan "Think different" and produced a 60-second commercial to promote the slogan. This commercial showed people who were able to "think differently," such as Albert Einstein, Mahatma Gandhi, Martin Luther King Jr., and many others. It was later cut short to 30 seconds and altered such that Seinfeld was included at the end, although he had not been in the original cut. This shorter version of the commercial aired only once, during the series finale of Seinfeld. 

 
In 2004, Seinfeld appeared in two commercial webisodes promoting American Express, titled The Adventures of Seinfeld & Superman. In these, Seinfeld appeared with a cartoon rendering of Superman, to whom reference was made in numerous episodes of Seinfeld as Seinfeld's hero, voiced by Patrick Warburton (character David Puddy on Seinfeld). The webisodes were directed by Barry Levinson and aired briefly on television. Seinfeld and "Superman" were also interviewed by Matt Lauer in a specially recorded interview for the Today show. On November 18, 2004, Seinfeld appeared at the National Museum of American History to donate the "puffy shirt" he wore in the Seinfeld episode of the same name. He also gave a speech when presenting the "puffy shirt," saying humorously that "This is the most embarrassing moment of my life." On May 13, 2006, Seinfeld had a cameo appearance on Saturday Night Live as host Julia Louis-Dreyfus' assassin. Louis-Dreyfus in her opening monolog mentioned the "Seinfeld curse." While talking about how ridiculous the "curse" was, a stage light suddenly fell next to her. The camera moved to a catwalk above the stage where Seinfeld was standing, holding a large pair of bolt cutters. He angrily muttered, "Damn it!" upset that it did not hit her. Louis-Dreyfus continued to say that she is indeed not cursed.

On February 25, 2007, Seinfeld appeared at the 79th Academy Awards as the presenter for "Best Documentary." Before announcing the nominations, he did a monologue about the unspoken agreement between movie theater owners and movie patrons. On October 4, 2007, Seinfeld made a guest appearance as himself in the 30 Rock episode "SeinfeldVision." On February 24, 2008, at the 80th Academy Awards, Seinfeld appeared as the voice of his Bee Movie animated character Barry, presenting Best Animated Short Film. Before announcing the nominees, he showed a montage of film clips featuring bees, saying that they were some of his early work (as Barry).

On June 2, 2008, amidst his spring 2008 tour, Seinfeld performed in his hometown of New York City for a one-night-only show at the Hammerstein Ballroom to benefit Stand Up for a Cure, a charity aiding lung cancer research at Memorial Sloan Kettering Cancer Center. In August 2008, the Associated Press reported that Jerry Seinfeld would be the pitchman for Windows Vista, as part of a $300-million advertising campaign by Microsoft. The ads, which were intended to create interest for Windows in support of the subsequent "I'm a PC" advertisements, began airing in mid-September 2008. They were cut from television after three installments; Microsoft opted to continue with the "I'm a PC" advertisements and run the Seinfeld ads on the Microsoft website as a series of longer advertisements. In March 2009, it was announced that Seinfeld and the entire cast of Seinfeld would be appearing for a reunion in Larry David's HBO series Curb Your Enthusiasm. The fictional reunion took place in the seventh season's finale and starred most of the original cast, including Julia Louis-Dreyfus, Jason Alexander, Michael Richards, in a multiple-episode arc. Seinfeld appeared on an episode of the Starz original series Head Case. As was the case in many of his previous guest appearances on sitcoms, he played himself.

In Australia, Seinfeld appeared on a series of advertisements for the Greater Building Society, a building society based in New South Wales and southeastern Queensland. His appearance in these ads was highly publicized and considered a coup for the society, being the third time Seinfeld had appeared in a television commercial. The advertisements were filmed in Cedarhurst, Long Island, with the street designed to emulate Beaumont Street in Hamilton, where the Greater's head offices are located. Seinfeld also wrote the scripts for the 15 advertisements that were filmed. The ads largely aired in the Northern New South Wales television market, where the society has most of its branches. Seinfeld was the first guest on Jay Leno's talk show The Jay Leno Show, which premiered on September 14, 2009. Seinfeld was featured on Saturday Night Lives Weekend Update sketch to do the "Really!?!" segment with Seth Meyers. He executive produced and regularly appeared as a panelist in The Marriage Ref. On August 30, 2010, Seinfeld made a surprise guest appearance on The Howard Stern Show, ending the feud the two had in the early 1990s.

Seinfeld toured the U.S. in 2011 and made his first stand-up appearance in the UK in 11 years. In July 2011, he was a surprise guest on The Daily Show, helping Jon Stewart to suppress his urge to tell "cheap" "Michele Bachmann's husband acts gay" jokes. Seinfeld also launched a personal archives website at JerrySeinfeld.com and appeared in the HBO special Talking Funny with fellow comedians Chris Rock, Louis C.K., and Ricky Gervais in the same year.

Comedians in Cars Getting Coffee 

In 2012, Seinfeld started a web series titled Comedians in Cars Getting Coffee, in which he would pick up a fellow comedian in a different car each episode and take them out for coffee and conversation. The show originally aired on the Crackle streaming service and then was bought by Netflix. The initial series consisted of ten episodes lasting from 7 to 25 minutes each. The show has continued to get high-profile guests such as Tina Fey, Dave Chappelle, Louis C.K., Eddie Murphy, Steve Martin, David Letterman, Chris Rock, John Mulaney, Mel Brooks, Don Rickles, Ellen DeGeneres, Howard Stern, and Jerry Lewis. The show has also hosted Seinfeld alums Larry David, Julia Louis-Dreyfus, Jason Alexander, and Michael Richards. Season seven featured its most high-profile guest, then-President Barack Obama. In a farewell tribute video for the Obamas before the President left office, Seinfeld stated, "That knocking on the Oval Office window. That probably was the peak of my entire existence."

Seinfeld signed a deal with Netflix in January 2017. As part of the deal, all episodes of Comedians in Cars Getting Coffee would be made available on the streaming service, in addition to a new 24-episode season.

Other appearances 
In June 2013, Seinfeld appeared on rapper Wale's album The Gifted, on the song "Outro About Nothing." Seinfeld received coverage for his speech at the 2014 Clio Awards ceremony, where he received an honorary award, as media reporters said that he "mocked" and "ripped apart" the advertising industry; his statement that "I love advertising because I love lying" received particular attention.

In 2014, Seinfeld hosted the special Don Rickles: One Night Only at the Apollo Theatre. The event celebrated Don Rickles and his career, but also served as a roast among friends. Those who participated in the event included Jon Stewart, David Letterman, Tina Fey, Amy Poehler, Nathan Lane, Regis Philbin, Robert De Niro, and Martin Scorsese.

On February 15, 2015, Seinfeld made a guest appearance on the Saturday Night Live 40th Anniversary Special, where he hosted the "Questions from the Audience" segment, which included cameos from Michael Douglas, John Goodman, James Franco, Larry David, Ellen Cleghorne, Dakota Johnson, Tim Meadows, Bob Odenkirk, and Sarah Palin (who Seinfeld initially mistook for Tina Fey).

On May 20, 2015, Seinfeld made a guest appearance on David Letterman's final Late Show episode. Seinfeld joined other friends of the show to pay tribute to Letterman. The other guests included Alec Baldwin, Barbara Walters, Steve Martin, Jim Carrey, Chris Rock, Julia Louis-Dreyfus, Peyton Manning, Tina Fey, and Bill Murray who all participated in The Top Ten List segment, "Things I've Always Wanted to Say to Dave."

In January 2017, Seinfeld went on The Tonight Show with Jimmy Fallon and joined Dave Chappelle and Jimmy Fallon in honoring outgoing First Lady Michelle Obama, and played a game of Catchphrase, which Obama and Fallon won to Seinfeld's dismay.

In October 2020, Seinfeld joined Steve Martin in a discussion about comedy at The New Yorker Festival. They discussed subjects ranging from the creative process, Netflix, and The Oscars, to their comedy backgrounds, and the future of comedy during the COVID-19 pandemic.

Netflix deal 
Seinfeld made a deal with the streaming service Netflix that included placing Seinfeld and Comedians in Cars Getting Coffee on their streaming service as well as two new Seinfeld stand-up specials and the development of scripted and non-scripted comedy programming.

On September 19, 2017, Netflix released the stand-up comedy special Jerry Before Seinfeld. The special follows Seinfeld as he returns for a stand-up routine at the New York City comedy club, Comic Strip Live, which started his career. The special is intercut with documentary clips and his stand-up special. The special was later released as an LP, CD and download album, and was nominated for a 2018 Grammy Award for Best Comedy Album.

In 2020, it was announced that Netflix would be releasing Seinfeld's first original stand-up special in 22 years, 23 Hours to Kill. The special premiered on May 5.

Books
Seinfeld wrote the book SeinLanguage, released in 1993. Written as his television show was first rising in popularity, it is primarily an adaptation of his stand-up material. The title comes from an article in Entertainment Weekly listing the numerous catchphrases for which the show was responsible. In 2002, he wrote the children's book Halloween. The book was illustrated by James Bennett. Seinfeld wrote the forewords to Ted L. Nancy's Letters from a Nut series of books and Ed Broth's Stories from a Moron. Seinfeld also wrote the foreword to the Peanut Butter & Co. Cookbook. In October 2020, Seinfeld released his new book Is This Anything?. The book chronicles Seinfeld's 45 years working in comedy and contains many of his best bits that span from various decades.

Influences
Seinfeld has stated, "On the Mount Rushmore of stand-up comedy, there are four faces, in my opinion: Richard Pryor, George Carlin, Bill Cosby and Don Rickles." Seinfeld has also cited as his influences the humorist Jean Shepherd, Mad Magazine, Jonathan Winters, Jerry Lewis, Robert Klein, and Abbott and Costello. He stated, "Monty Python was a gigantic influence on me. They were just about silly, funny things that meant nothing, and that’s the stuff I love. There’s a wonderful childlike freedom in those kinds of things."

In the Netflix comedy special, Jerry Before Seinfeld, he displayed his personal comedy albums collection from when he was a teenager. These albums included:

Lenny Bruce – Thank You Masked Man (1972)
George Carlin – Class Clown (1972)
Steve Martin – Let's Get Small (1977)
Bob Newhart – The Button-Down Mind of Bob Newhart (1960)
Mike Nichols and Elaine May – Improvisations to Music (1958)
Mel Brooks and Carl Reiner – 2000 and One Years with Carl Reiner and Mel Brooks (1961)

In an interview with Entertainment Weekly, Seinfeld stated his five favorite films are The Heartbreak Kid (1972), The Graduate (1967), The In-Laws (1979), A Night at the Opera (1935), and Glengarry Glen Ross (1992).

Those influenced by Seinfeld include John Mulaney, Jim Gaffigan, Judd Apatow, Ellen DeGeneres, and Issa Rae.

Personal life
Seinfeld is a fan of the New York Mets, and periodically calls Steve Somers' show on WFAN-AM, a sports talk radio station, as "Jerry from Queens." Seinfeld called four innings of a Mets game on SportsNet New York on June 23, 2010, reuniting with analyst Keith Hernandez, who appeared in the Seinfeld two-part episode entitled "The Boyfriend."

Seinfeld is left-handed and the first joke he ever wrote was about the topic. In a 2014 interview with NBC News, he made statements suggesting that he believed he was on the autism spectrum. However, following criticism for his alleged self-diagnosis, he later clarified that he is not autistic and had been commenting on a play about the condition that he "related to [...] on some level."

Seinfeld has made several political contributions, including to George W. Bush's and Al Gore's presidential campaigns in 2000, and subsequently to four Democratic Party primary candidates in 2000 and 2004.

Relationships and marriage 
Years before Seinfeld was created, Seinfeld dated Carol Leifer. She was a fellow comedian, and one of the inspirations for the Seinfeld character Elaine Benes. On national television with sex therapist and talk show host Dr. Ruth Westheimer, he mentioned that he was engaged in 1984 but called it off.

In May 1993, then 38-year-old Seinfeld met 17-year-old Shoshanna Lonstein in Central Park. After a brief conversation, he got her phone number. Lonstein was still a senior in high school and would turn 18 on May 29, 1993. Seinfeld and Lonstein dated for approximately four years, from 1993 to 1997. She transferred from George Washington University to UCLA, in part to be with him, and cited missing New York City and constant press coverage as reasons for the relationship ending. 

The age difference led to intense media scrutiny. While Seinfeld was a guest on Howard Stern's talk show, Stern said, "so, you sit in Central Park and have a candy bar on a string and pull it when the girls come?" at which point Seinfeld replied, "she's not 17, definitely not." A few months later, in his second Howard Stern interview, Seinfeld insisted, "I didn't realize she was so young. This is the only girl I ever went out with who was that young. I wasn't dating her. We just went to a restaurant, and that was it." Early in their relationship, Spy Magazine referred to Lonstein as "a legal voter", mocking her young age. 

In an October 1993 Playboy interview, Seinfeld described the reactions to the relationship as ranging "from horrified to just busting buttons with pride that they know me", noting that his female acquaintances had overall reacted more negatively than his male ones. He said that his assistant "was so mad" she punched him, whereas his mother was "thrilled". He concluded, "if she's 18, if she's intelligent, that's fine". In March 1994, Seinfeld again defended their age difference in an interview with People, stating that "Shoshanna is a person, not an age." Julia Louis-Dreyfus said in a 1998 New York interview that she was in favor of the relationship, as "it was a happy one for him", and added that she did not believe there was anything wrong with it.

In August 1998, while at a Reebok Sports Club, Seinfeld met Jessica Sklar, a public relations executive for Tommy Hilfiger who had just returned from a three-week honeymoon in Italy with then-husband Eric Nederlander, a theatrical producer and scion of a theater-owning family. Unaware of Sklar's marital status, Seinfeld invited her out. When Sklar eventually told Seinfeld about her relationship situation, she said, "I told him I didn't think this was the right time for me to be involved with anybody." Two months later, Sklar filed for divorce and continued dating Seinfeld. The pair married on December 25, 1999. Comedian George Wallace was the best man at the wedding. After the nuptials, Jerry and Jessica Seinfeld bought Billy Joel's house in Amagansett, Long Island, for US$32 million after news of the couple's interest in the property became public in 2000. The Seinfelds have one daughter and two sons.

Religion 
Seinfeld is Jewish and has incorporated elements of his Jewish identity in his work.

Seinfeld stated that he took a Scientology course when he was in his 20s; he said that he found it interesting but that he didn't pursue it any further.

Transcendental Meditation 
In December 2012, Seinfeld said that he had been practicing Transcendental Meditation (TM) for 40 years. He promoted the use of the technique in the treatment of post-traumatic stress disorder with Bob Roth of the David Lynch Foundation in December 2012 on Good Morning America, and also appeared at a 2009 David Lynch Foundation benefit for TM, at which Paul McCartney and Ringo Starr appeared. On November 5, 2015, the David Lynch Foundation organized a benefit concert at New York City's Carnegie Hall called "Change Begins Within" to promote transcendental meditation for stress control. "It's been the greatest companion technique of living that I've ever come across, and I'm thrilled to be part of this movement that seems to have really been reinvigorated by Bob [Roth] and David Lynch," Seinfeld said. "I would do anything that I could to promote it in the world, because I think it's the greatest thing as a life tool, as a work tool and just making things make sense."

Charity 
In 1999, Seinfeld auctioned a Breitling Chronomat watch as part of the "Famous Faces, Watch Auction For Charity" event in New York City. This watch sold for $11,000.

In 2001, Jerry and Jessica Seinfeld created the charity organization The Good+Foundation after their first child was born. Good+Foundation grants donations of products and services to programs that have demonstrated a capacity to address family poverty in three focus areas: supporting new mothers, investing in early childhood, and engaging fathers. GOOD+ Foundation has donated over $42M worth of items through its partner network across the United States.

Seinfeld has also participated in Jon Stewart's charity event, Night of Too Many Stars.

Wealth
According to Forbes magazine, Seinfeld's cumulative earnings from Seinfeld as of 2004 was $267 million, placing him at the top of the celebrity earnings list that year. He turned down $5 million per episode, for 22 episodes, to continue the show for a 10th season. Seinfeld earned $100 million from syndication deals and stand-up performances in 2004, and $60 million in 2006. He also earned $10 million for appearing with Bill Gates in Microsoft's 2008 advertisements for Windows. Between June 2008 and June 2009, Seinfeld earned $85 million, making him the world's highest-paid comedian during those 12 months. In 2013, Forbes documented Seinfeld's annual income as $32 million. In mid-2013, Seinfeld disputed Forbes claims regarding his income and net worth on The Howard Stern Show. Seinfeld was ranked by Forbes the highest-paid comedian for 2015, the second-highest paid in 2016, and the highest-paid again in 2017. Seinfeld's income between June 2016 and June 2017 was $69 million.

Automobiles

Seinfeld is an automobile enthusiast and collector, and he owns a collection of about 150 cars, including a large Porsche collection. He rented a hangar at the Santa Monica Airport in Santa Monica, California, for an extended period during the 1990s for storage of some of the vehicles in the collection. In 2002, Seinfeld purchased property on the Upper West Side of Manhattan in New York City where he built a $1.4 million two-story garage to store part of his Porsche collection on the East Coast. One tally has Seinfeld owning 43 Porsches. Paul Bannister has written that Seinfeld's collection includes Porsche 911s from various years, 10 Porsche Boxsters each painted a different color, and the 1955 Porsche 550 Spyder, the same model and pearl-grey color that actor James Dean had been driving before he crashed that car and subsequently died.

The Discovery Channel television show Chasing Classic Cars claimed that Seinfeld owns the first and last produced air-cooled Porsche 911s. The centerpiece is a $700,000 Porsche 959, one of only 337 built. He was originally not allowed to drive it, because the car was "not street legal." U.S. emissions and crash tests had not been performed for the model because Porsche refused to donate four Porsche 959s for destruction tests. Seinfeld imported the car "for exhibition purposes," on the stipulation that it may never be driven on U.S. roads. The car was made U.S. street legal in 1999 under the "Show or Display" federal law. Seinfeld wrote an article for the February 2004 issue of Automobile, reviewing the Porsche Carrera GT.

In 2008, Seinfeld was involved in a car accident when the brakes on his 1967 Fiat 500 failed and, to avoid an intersection, he pulled the emergency brake while turning sharply, ultimately causing the car to flip onto its side. No one was hurt.

Espresso machines
A coffee and espresso machine aficionado, Seinfeld owns multiple espresso machines, including the $17,000 Elektra Belle Epoque and two machines manufactured by Slayer and Breville, respectively. Seinfeld described his single-group Slayer machine, which costs upwards of $8,500, as a "beautiful machine." When NPR asked him about the influence of coffee culture in the U.S., Seinfeld responded in 2013:I never liked [coffee] and I didn't understand it and I used to do a lot of stuff in my stand-up set in the '80s and '90s about how I don't 'get' coffee. And then something happened about five years ago. I started touring a lot, and we would have these great big, fun breakfasts in the hotel and [coffee] just seemed to go really well [with breakfast]. [Now], I've just started this espresso thing.

Work

Film

Television

Stand-up home video appearances

References

Video games

Discography 
Comedy specials

Directing

Bibliography 
SeinLanguage (1993)
Halloween (2002)
Is This Anything? (2020)

Writing credits for Seinfeld

The list below only includes episodes mainly written by Seinfeld, as he (and Larry David in Seasons 1 through 7) rewrote the drafts for each episode.

Awards and nominations

Primetime Emmy Awards

Grammy Awards

Golden Globe Awards

Screen Actors Guild Award

Other awards
American Comedy Award for Funniest Male Performer in a TV Series (1992)
American Comedy Award for Funniest Male Performer in a TV Series (1993)
Nominated – American Comedy Award for Funniest Male Performer in a TV Series (1996)
Nominated – American Comedy Award for Funniest Male Performer in a TV Series (1999)

References

External links

 
 
 
 
 
 
 

1954 births
Living people
20th-century American comedians
20th-century American Jews
20th-century American male actors
20th-century American male writers
20th-century American non-fiction writers
21st-century American comedians
21st-century American Jews
21st-century American male actors
21st-century American male writers
21st-century American non-fiction writers
American car collectors
American film producers
American male comedians
American male comedy actors
American male non-fiction writers
American male screenwriters
American male television actors
American male television writers
American male voice actors
American memoirists
American philanthropists
American stand-up comedians
American television writers
American Zionists
Best Musical or Comedy Actor Golden Globe (television) winners
Comedians from New York (state)
Comedians from New York City
Film producers from New York (state)
Jewish American male actors
Jewish American male comedians
Jewish American writers
Jewish male comedians
Jews and Judaism in New York City
Las Vegas shows
Male actors from New York (state)
Male actors from New York City
Massapequa High School alumni
People from Amagansett, New York
People from Massapequa, New York
People from the Upper West Side
Primetime Emmy Award winners
Queens College, City University of New York alumni
Screenwriters from New York (state)
Showrunners
State University of New York at Oswego alumni
Television producers from New York City
Writers from Brooklyn